In number theory, Carmichael's theorem, named after the American mathematician R. D. Carmichael,
states that, for any nondegenerate Lucas sequence of the first kind Un(P, Q) with relatively prime parameters P, Q and positive discriminant, an element Un with n ≠ 1, 2, 6 has at least one prime divisor that does not divide any earlier one except the 12th Fibonacci number F(12) = U12(1, −1) = 144 and its equivalent U12(−1, −1) = −144.

In particular, for n greater than 12, the nth Fibonacci number F(n) has at least one prime divisor that does not divide any earlier Fibonacci number.

Carmichael (1913, Theorem 21) proved this theorem.  Recently, Yabuta (2001) gave a simple proof.

Statement

Then, for n ≠ 1, 2, 6, Un(P, Q) has at least one prime divisor that does not divide any Um(P, Q) with m < n, except U12(1, −1) = F(12) = 144, U12(−1, −1) = −F(12) = −144.
Such a prime p is called a characteristic factor or a primitive prime divisor of Un(P, Q).
Indeed, Carmichael showed a slightly stronger theorem: For n ≠ 1, 2, 6, Un(P, Q) has at least one primitive prime divisor not dividing D except U3(1, −2) = U3(−1, −2) = 3, U5(1, −1) = U5(−1, −1) = F(5) = 5, U12(1, −1) = F(12) = 144, U12(−1, −1) = −F(12) = −144.

Note that D should be greater than 0; thus the cases U13(1, 2), U18(1, 2) and U30(1, 2), etc. are not included, since in this case D = −7 < 0.

Fibonacci and Pell cases
The only exceptions in Fibonacci case for n up to 12 are:

F(1) = 1 and F(2) = 1, which have no prime divisors
F(6) = 8, whose only prime divisor is 2 (which is F(3))
F(12) = 144, whose only prime divisors are 2 (which is F(3)) and 3 (which is F(4))

The smallest primitive prime divisor of F(n) are
1, 1, 2, 3, 5, 1, 13, 7, 17, 11, 89, 1, 233, 29, 61, 47, 1597, 19, 37, 41, 421, 199, 28657, 23, 3001, 521, 53, 281, 514229, 31, 557, 2207, 19801, 3571, 141961, 107, 73, 9349, 135721, 2161, 2789, 211, 433494437, 43, 109441, ... 
Carmichael's theorem says that every Fibonacci number, apart from the exceptions listed above, has at least one primitive prime divisor.

If n > 1, then the nth Pell number has at least one prime divisor that does not divide any earlier Pell number. The smallest primitive prime divisor of nth Pell number are
1, 2, 5, 3, 29, 7, 13, 17, 197, 41, 5741, 11, 33461, 239, 269, 577, 137, 199, 37, 19, 45697, 23, 229, 1153, 1549, 79, 53, 113, 44560482149, 31, 61, 665857, 52734529, 103, 1800193921, 73, 593, 9369319, 389, 241, ...

See also
 Zsigmondy's theorem

References

.

Fibonacci numbers
Theorems in number theory